The 2010 NCAA Division III Men's Ice Hockey Tournament was the culmination of the 2009–10 season, the 27th such tournament in NCAA history. It concluded with Norwich defeating St. Norbert in the championship game 2-1 in overtime. All First Round and Quarterfinal matchups were held at home team venues, while all succeeding games were played at the Herb Brooks Arena in Lake Placid, New York.

Qualifying teams
The following teams qualified for the tournament. Automatic bids were offered to the conference tournament champion of seven different conferences. Four at-large bids were available for the highest-ranked non-conference tournament champions (overall seed in parentheses). ECAC West, which had fewer than the number of requisite teams (seven) to qualify for an automatic bid for several years, lost its automatic bid.

Format
The tournament featured four rounds of play. All rounds were Single-game elimination. The top four teams were arranged so that were they all to reach the national semifinal, the first overall seed would play the fourth seed while the second seed would play the third seed. Because only one western team could have received a bye into the quarterfinals, all western teams played in the first round in order to prevent lower-seeded teams from having to travel long-distances in the first two rounds. The other first round participants were the two lowest-seeded eastern teams. 

The winners of the two western first round matches would play one another in the quarterfinals. The top eastern seed would play the winner of the eastern first round game while the other two quarterfinal matches were played between eastern teams as follows: the second-seeded eastern team played the fifth-seeded team while the third-seed played the fourth-seed. The higher-seeded team served as host for all first round and quarterfinal meetings.

Tournament Bracket

Note: * denotes overtime period(s)

All-Tournament Team
G: Ryan Klingensmith (Norwich)
G: B. J. O'Brien* (St. Norbert)
D: Steve Coon (Norwich)
D: Sam Tikka (St. Norbert)
F: Chad Anderson (Norwich)
F: Pier-Olivier Cotnoir (Norwich)
F: Johan Ryd (St. Norbert)
* Most Outstanding Player(s)

Record by conference

References

External links
Division III Men's Ice Hockey Record Book

 
NCAA Division III ice hockey